Coosemans is a Flemish surname.

Notable people with this surname include:
 Alexander Coosemans (1627–1689), Flemish painter 
 Colin Coosemans (born 1992), Belgian football player
 Henri Coosemans (born 1922), Belgian basketball player
 Joseph Coosemans (1828–1904), Belgian landscape painter

Surnames of Belgian origin